Glen Erin Creek is a stream in the U.S. state of South Dakota.

Glen Erin Creek derives its name from Erin, or Ireland, the native land of a first settler.

See also
List of rivers of South Dakota

References

Rivers of Custer County, South Dakota
Rivers of South Dakota